Budhi Khola is a river passing though Itahari in Nepal. The river acts as a border between Sunsari and Morang districts. The main catchment of the river lies between Dharan and  Tarahara and flows from northern mid hills near Dharan, passes Itahari, Dhuhabi and finally towards India. In India and southern Nepal, the river is called Keshaliya  Khola.  In 2017, the flood in the river killed six peoples.

See also
List of rivers of Nepal

References

Rivers of Nepal
Rivers of Koshi Province
Transborder rivers